Benito de Jesús Born on October 25, 1912  in Barceloneta, Puerto Rico was a legendary Puerto Rican songwriter of romantic ballads, including "Nuestro Juramento", "La copa rota", "Sigamos pecando". He was also founder of the group Trio Vegabajeño.

He died on June 24, 2010 at the age of 97 at Auxilio Mutuo Hospital in Hato Rey, Puerto Rico.

References

External links

1912 births
2010 deaths
People from Barceloneta, Puerto Rico
Puerto Rican musicians